Mohammed Nasim (1948–2020) was a Bangladeshi politician and a Minister of Home, Minister of Industry, and Minister of Post and Telecommunications.

Mohammed Nasim may also refer to:
Abu Saleh Mohammad Nasim (born 1946), former Chief of Staff of Bangladesh Army.
Mohammad Nasim (Guantanamo captive 453), believed to have been born in Shahidan, Afghanistan in 1973.
Mohammed Nasim (Guantanamo detainee 849), believed to have been born in Megan, Afghanistan in 1980.
Mohammad Nasim (Guantanamo captive 958), believed to have been born in Pai Warzai, Afghanistan in 1962.